The 2008 WNBA season was the 12th season for the Sacramento Monarchs. The team reached the playoffs for the man consecutive season. It was also their 9th and final playoff berth before folding a season later.

Offseason
The following player was selected in the Expansion Draft: 
 Kristin Haynie Sacramento Monarchs

Transactions
April 18 The Monarchs signed Amy Sanders to a training camp contract.
April 16 The Monarchs signed Janie Mitchell to a training camp contract.
April 15 The Monarchs signed Dionne Marsh to a training camp contract.
March 31 The Monarchs re-signed free agent DeMya Walker.
March 4 The Monarchs re-signed free agent Ticha Penicheiro.
March 3 The Monarchs re-signed free agents Rebekkah Brunson, Linda Frohlich and Nicole Powell.

WNBA Draft

Preseason

Regular season

Season standings

Season Schedule

September 12 game against Houston was postponed due to Hurricane Ike.

Player stats
Note: GP= Games played; REB= Rebounds; AST= Assists; STL = Steals; BLK = Blocks; PTS = Points; AVG = Average

Roster

Playoffs

Awards and honors
Rebekkah Brunson, All-WNBA Defensive Second Team
Ticha Penicheiro, All-WNBA Defensive First Team

References

External links 
 Monarchs/Comets game postponed

Sacramento Monarchs seasons
Sacramento
Sacramento Monarchs